Barry Smith (born 16 April 1953 in London) is a British former long-distance runner. He competed in the 1980 Summer Olympics.

He was a frequent part of the English team at the IAAF World Cross Country Championships. After a junior team medal at the 1972 International Cross Country Championships and 1973 IAAF World Cross Country Championships, he broke through as a senior in 1977 by sharing in the team silver medals. He was part of the English team that on the championship in both 1979 and 1980.

On the circuit he won the Antrim International Cross Country in 1981 and that same year won the 5000 m IAAF Golden Event ahead of Tolossa Kotu of Ethiopia.

References

1953 births
Living people
Athletes from London
English male long-distance runners
Olympic athletes of Great Britain
Athletes (track and field) at the 1980 Summer Olympics